The Devil's Claim is a 1920 American silent drama film starring Sessue Hayakawa and Colleen Moore. A print of this film survives.

Story
As summarized in a film publication, Akbar Khan, a novelist in New York, uses his love affairs as inspiration for his books. His current affair is with Indora, a Persian girl. However, the passion has left the relationship and he casts her out. Social worker Virginia Crosby comes to her aid and pretends to fall for Khan. He is inspired to write about "The Devil’s Trademark" (this was the working title of the film), an adaption of a serial for a popular magazine. The film flashes to his vision of the story, which is set in Paris with Khan as the hero Hassan. Hassan's companion in the story is a beautiful Hindu woman. The story includes a stolen talisman, a blindfolded marriage, Egyptian sorceresses, a sect of devil worshipers, and reincarnated evil spirits. Virginia then leaves Khan before the story is finished, and sends for Indora, who steps into her place.

Cast
 Sessue Hayakawa as Akbar Khan/Hassan
 Rhea Mitchell as Virginia Crosby
 Colleen Moore as Indora
 William Buckley as Spencer Wellington
 Sidney Payne as Kemal
 Joe Wray as Salim

References

Bibliography
Jeff Codori (2012), Colleen Moore; A Biography of the Silent Film Star, McFarland Publishing, (Print , EBook ).

External links

 Alt Film Guide page for the film
 BFI page for the film
 
 
 NY Times review
 The Library of Congress American Silent Feature Film Survival Catalog: The Devil's Claim

1920 films
American silent feature films
Films based on short fiction
Silent American drama films
1920 drama films
Haworth Pictures Corporation films
American black-and-white films
Film Booking Offices of America films
1920s American films